"I Don't Care (Just as Long as You Love Me)" is a 1964 single by Buck Owens, and was his fourth number one on the country chart.  "I Don't Care (Just as Long as You Love Me)" spent six weeks at number one and a total of twenty-seven weeks on the chart.  The B-side of the song, "Don't Let Her Know", peaked at number thirty-three on the country chart.

Chart performance

References

1964 singles
Buck Owens songs
Songs written by Buck Owens
Song recordings produced by Ken Nelson (American record producer)
Capitol Records singles
1964 songs